Octoblepharum is a genus of haplolepideous mosses (Dicranidae) in the monotypic family Octoblepharaceae . The genus Octoblepharum was previously placed in family Calymperaceae.

Species

The genus contains the following species:

Octoblepharum africanum 
Octoblepharum albidum 
Octoblepharum ampullaceum 
Octoblepharum arthrocormoides 
Octoblepharum asperum 
Octoblepharum blumii 
Octoblepharum brevisetum 
Octoblepharum cocuiense 
Octoblepharum costatum 
Octoblepharum cylindricum 
Octoblepharum densifolium 
Octoblepharum dentatum 
Octoblepharum depressum 
Octoblepharum ekmanii 
Octoblepharum erectifolium 
Octoblepharum exiguum 
Octoblepharum incrassatum 
Octoblepharum leptoneuron 
Octoblepharum leucobryoides 
Octoblepharum octoblepharoides 
Octoblepharum papillosum 
Octoblepharum pulvinatum 
Octoblepharum rhaphidostegium 
Octoblepharum schimperi 
Octoblepharum scolopendrium 
Octoblepharum squarrosum 
Octoblepharum stramineum 
Octoblepharum tatei

References

Moss families
Dicranales
Taxa named by Johann Hedwig